The Old Yishuv (haYishuv haYashan) were the Jewish communities of the region of Palestine during the Ottoman period, up to the onset of Zionist aliyah and the consolidation of the New Yishuv by the end of World War I. In the late 19th century, the Old Yishuv comprised 0.3% of the world's Jews, representing 2–5% of the population of the Palestine region.

As opposed to the later Zionist aliyah and the New Yishuv, which began with the First Aliyah (of 1882) and was more based on a socialist and/or secular ideology emphasizing labor and self-sufficiency, many Jews of the Old Yishuv, whose members had continuously resided in or had come to the Southern Levant in the earlier centuries, were largely religious Jews, who depended on external donations (halukka) for financial support.

The Old Yishuv developed after a period of severe decline in Jewish communities of the Southern Levant during the early Middle Ages, and was composed of three clusters. The oldest group consisted of the Ladino-speaking Sephardic Jewish communities who settled in Ottoman Palestine in the late Mamluk and early Ottoman periods and the Arabic-speaking (Musta'arabi) communities who had already been living there since before the coming of Islam and had been culturally and linguistically Arabized.

A second group was composed of Ashkenazi Hasidic Jews who had emigrated from Europe in the 18th and early 19th centuries. A third wave consisted of Yishuv members who arrived in the late 19th century.

The Old Yishuv was thus generally divided into two independent communities—the Sephardim (including Musta'arabim), mainly consisting of the remains of Jewish communities of Galilee and the four Jewish holy cities, which had flourished in the 16th and 17th centuries; and the Ashkenazim, whose immigration from Europe was primarily since the 18th century.

The "Old Yishuv" term was coined by members of the "New Yishuv" in the late 19th century to distinguish themselves from the economically dependent and generally earlier Jewish communities, who mainly resided in the four holy cities of Judaism, and unlike the New Yishuv, had not embraced land ownership and agriculture.

Apart from the Old Yishuv centres in the four holy cities of Judaism, namely Jerusalem, Hebron, Tiberias and Safed, smaller communities also existed in Jaffa, Haifa, Peki'in, Acre, Nablus and Shfaram. Petah Tikva, although established in 1878 by the Old Yishuv, nevertheless was also supported by the arriving Zionists. Rishon LeZion, the first settlement founded by the Hovevei Zion in 1882, could be considered the true beginning of the "New Yishuv".

Background
While a vibrant Jewish center had continued to exist in the Galilee following the Jewish–Roman wars, its importance was reduced with increased Byzantine persecutions and the abolition of the Sanhedrin in the early 5th century. Jewish communities of the southern Levant under Byzantine rule fell into a final decline in the early 7th century, and with the Jewish revolt against Heraclius and Muslim conquest of Syria, the Jewish population had greatly reduced in numbers.

In early Middle Ages, the Jewish communities of southern Bilad al-Sham (Southern Syria), living under Muslim protection status, were dispersed among the key cities of the military districts of Jund Filastin and Jund al-Urdunn, with a number of poor Jewish villages existing in the Galilee and Judea.

Despite temporary revival, the Arab Muslim civil wars of the 8th and 9th centuries drove many non-Muslims out of the country, with no evidence of mass conversions, except for Samaritans.

The Crusader period marked the most serious decline, lasting through the 12th century. Maimonides traveled from Spain to Morocco and Egypt, and stayed in the Holy Land, probably sometime between 1165 and 1167, before settling in Egypt. He had then become a personal physician of Saladin, escorting him throughout his war campaigns against the Kingdom of Jerusalem.

Following the Crusaders' defeat and the conquest of Jerusalem, he urged Saladin to allow the resettlement of the Jews in the city, and several hundred of the long-existing Jewish community of Ashkelon resettled Jerusalem. Small Jewish communities were also existent at the time in Gaza and in desolate villages throughout upper and lower Galilee. 

The immigration of a group of 300 Jews headed by the Tosafists from England and France in 1211 struggled very hard upon arrival in Eretz Israel, as they had no financial support and no prospect of making a living. The vast majority of the settlers were wiped out by the Crusaders, who arrived in 1219, and the few survivors were allowed to live only in Acre. Their descendants blended with the original Jewish residents, called Mustarabim or Maghrebim, but more precisely Mashriqes (Murishkes).

The Mamluk period (1260-1517) saw an increase in the Jewish population, especially in the Galilee, but the Black Death epidemics had cut the country's demographics by at least one-third.

In 1260, Rabbi Yechiel of Paris arrived in Eretz Israel, at the time part of Mamluk Empire, along with his son and a large group of followers, settling in Acre. There he established the Talmudic academy Midrash haGadol d'Paris. He is believed to have died there between 1265 and 1268, and is buried near Haifa, at Mount Carmel. Nahmanides arrived in 1267 and settled in Acre as well.

In 1488, when Rabbi Ovadiya from Bertinoro arrived in the Mamluk domain of Syria and sent back letters regularly to his father in Italy, many in the diaspora came to regard living in Mamluk Syria as feasible.

History

Revival
In 1492 and again in 1498, when the Sephardic Jews were expelled from Spain and Portugal respectively, some took it as a call from heaven to migrate to Eretz Yisrael, which later changed hands between Mamluks and Ottomans. Don Joseph Nasi, with the financial backing and influence of his aunt, Doña Gracia Mendes, succeeded in resettling Tiberias and Safed in 1561 with Sephardic Jews, many of them former Anusim.

By the late 16th century, Safed had become a center of Kabbalah, inhabited by important rabbis and scholars. Among them were Rabbis Yakov bi Rav, Moses ben Jacob Cordovero, Yosef Karo, Abraham ben Eliezer Halevi and Isaac Luria. At this time there was a small community in Jerusalem headed by Rabbi Levi ibn Haviv also known as the Mahralbach. In 1620 Rabbi Yeshaye Horowitz, the Shelah Hakadosh, arrived from Prague.

Galilee, which had become the most important Jewish center, didn't last. By the early 17th century, the Ma'an Druzes initiated a power struggle, which led to serious instability in Mount Lebanon and the Galilee, eroding the Jewish communities. Economic shifts also led to negative demographic movement, and the Galilee Jewish population greatly declined.

Finally, in 1660, the cities of Tiberias and Safed were laid in ruins by the Druze warlords, and the remaining Jews fled as far as Jerusalem. Though Jews returned to Safed in 1662, it became a majority Muslim center of the Ottoman Sanjak of Safed.

Rabbi Yehuda he-Hasid
In 1700, a group of over 1,500 Ashkenazi Jews made aliyah and settled in Jerusalem. At that time, the Jewish population of the Old City was primarily Sephardi: 200 Ashkenazi Jews compared with a Sephardi community of 1,000. These Ashkenazi immigrants heeded the call of Rabbi Yehuda he-Hasid, a Maggid of Shedlitz, Poland who went from town to town advocating a return to Eretz Yisrael to redeem its soil.

Almost a third of the group died of hardship and illness during the long journey. Upon their arrival in the Holy Land, they immediately went to Jerusalem. Within days, their leader, Rabbi Yehuda he-Hasid, died. They borrowed money from local Arabs for the construction of a synagogue but soon ran out of funds and borrowed more money at very high rates of interest [disputed].

In 1720, when they were unable to repay their debts, Arab creditors broke into the synagogue, set it on fire, and destroyed their homes. The Jews fled the city and over the next century, any Jew dressed in Ashkenazi garb was a target of attack. Some of the Ashkenazi Jews who remained began to dress like Sephardi Jews. One known example is Rabbi Abraham Gershon of Kitov.

Hasidim and Perushim
In the 18th century, groups of Hasidim and Perushim settled in Eretz Israel, Ottoman Southern Syria at the time. In 1764 Rabbi Nachman of Horodenka, a disciple and mechutan of the Baal Shem Tov settled in Tiberias. According to "Aliyos to Eretz Yisrael," he was already in Southern Syria in 1750.

In 1777, the Hasidic leaders Rabbi Menachem Mendel of Vitebsk and Rabbi Avraham of Kaliski, disciples of the Maggid of Mezeritch, settled in the area. Mitnagdim began arriving in 1780. Most of them settled in Safed or Tiberias, but a few established an Ashkenazi Jewish community in Jerusalem, rebuilding the ruins of the Hurvat Yehudah He-Hasid (the destroyed synagogue of Judah He-Hasid).

Starting in 1830, about twenty disciples of the Chasam Sofer (Moses Schreiber) settled in Southern Syria, almost all of them in Jerusalem.

Ibrahim Pasha's rule

From 1831 to 1840, Syria fell under the rule of the Egyptian viceroi Muhammad Ali of Egypt and his son Ibrahim Pasha, who effectively extended the Egyptian domination to Damascus, driving the Ottomans north. Throughout the period a series of events greatly disturbed the demographic composition of the country, being the stage for the 1834 Syrian Peasant revolts and the 1838 Druze Revolt, which caused a great impact upon the Old Yishuv.

The greatest damage in lives and property was extended upon the Jewish communities of Safed and Hebron. In addition, the Galilee earthquake of 1837 destroyed Safed, killed thousands of its residents, and contributed to the reconstitution of Jerusalem as the main center of the Old Yishuv.

Generally tolerant to the minorities, Ibrahim Pasha promoted the Jewish and Christian communities of Southern Syria, but overall his turbulent period of rule is considered probably the worst stage for the development of the Old Yishuv.

Restored Ottoman rule

With the restoration of the Ottoman rule in 1840 with British and French intervention, the region began experiencing a serious rise in the population, rising from just 250,000 in 1840 to 600,000 by the end of the 19th century. Though most of the increase was Muslim, also the Jewish community gradually rose in numbers.

A number of new Jewish communities were established in the late 19th century, including Mishkenot Sha'ananim, which was built by British Jewish banker and philanthropist Sir Moses Montefiore in 1860 as an almshouse, paid for by the estate of an American Jewish businessman from New Orleans, Judah Touro; and Petah Tikva, established in 1878.

Economy

Halukka
Many of the religious Jews that immigrated to the Old Yishuv at this time were elderly and immigrated to die in the Holy Land, whereas most Orthodox Jews in the Old Yishuv had lived for centuries in the four Holy cities—Safed, Hebron, Jerusalem and Tiberias. These devoutly religious Jews were devoted to prayer, and the study of Torah, Talmud, or Kabbalah, and likewise had no independent source of living.

As those Jews fulfilled the Talmudic commandment of God that the Jewish people must live in the land of Eretz Yisrael to incite the coming of the Messiah, and, in part as they prayed for the welfare of Diaspora Jewry (Jews that live outside of Eretz Israel), as a result, a worldwide communal support system developed; or the system of Jewish charity called Halukka (lit. "distribution").

By virtue of a living Jewish population in Eretz Israel, the religious Jews of the Old Yishuv helped the Diaspora maintain a stronger, deeper connection to their roots there and enhanced the Diaspora's general, as well as Jewish identities. In exchange, the Diaspora provided communities with financial support which was the economic succor of the residents of the Old Yishuv. Jews in the Diaspora observed Jewish religious traditions of Mitzvot (good deeds) and Tzedakah ("charity" or "justice").

Many of the arrivals were noted Torah scholars whose communities felt honored to be represented in Eretz Yisrael and sent them ma'amodos (stipends) on a regular basis.

The kollel network that was established many years prior in Jewish communities around the globe, to financially and charitably take care of one another while under the civic authority and care of the foreign governments of the countries in which Jews lived, also facilitated the use of halukkah charity and allowed religious Jews to study Torah without having to work for a living.

Money for this purpose was raised in Jewish communities around the world for distribution among the various kollelim that were correspondingly established (by country or community of origin) in the Old Yishuv, especially in Jerusalem.

From the 13th through the turn-of-the 20th century, Jewish communities living in the Old Yishuv dispatched travelling emissaries (shlihim or meshullahim) to raise money in the diaspora for sustenance.

The funds they raised were known as chalukah, also spelled  halukka, and were collected around the world by these envoys of the religious community, who subsequently assisted in the transference of Diaspora funds to Eretz Yisrael under the larger umbrella of welfare and financial aid.

The halukka system, which promoted dependence on charity, was harshly criticized in later years as being ineffectual, especially during the time when Zionism arose in Europe (1830s–1880s), and increasing Jewish ideals towards fostering productivity among the existing Jewish community of the Old Yishuv, as well as for themselves. This period saw a shift from traditional forms of charity towards efforts of "self-help" and productivity.

Etrog export

The export of etrogs cultivated in Eretz Yisrael was also a source of income for the Old Yishuv. This predated the Hovevei Zion idea of the return to the land and Jewish farming, prior to which citrons for use on the Sukkot holiday were cultivated exclusively by Arab peasants and then merchandized by the Jews.

According to Jacob Saphir, the etrog business was monopolized by the Sephardic kollel even before 1835. They had contracted with the Arabic growers of Umm al-Fahm for their entire progeny of Balady citron. In the 1840s they were also the instrumental in the introduction of the Greek citron which was already cultivated in Jewish owned farms.

In the 1870s the Sephardim switched to the Greek variety, and the Ashkenazi Salant partners took over the Balady business. After a little while, controversy erupted regarding its kashrut status.

Rabbi Chaim Elozor Wax, president of Kupat Rabbi Meir Baal HaNes Kollel Polen of Warsaw, was instrumental in making the Israeli-grown etrogim saleable in Ashkenazi Jewish communities in Europe. He planted thousands of trees in a donated orchard near Tiberias, and turned the proceeds over to the Warsaw Kollel.

Agricultural settlement
Generally the Old Yishuv did not participate in the creation of agricultural communities, which was begun in earnest by the immigrants that arrived from Eastern Europe beginning in the 1870s and 1880s, largely associated with the Hovevei Zion. Towards this end, Hovevei Zion members, including the philanthropist Isaac Leib Goldberg, purchased land from the Ottoman government and local inhabitants.

Although there was some earlier support from religious Jews in Europe such as Rabbi Zvi Hirsh Kalischer of Thorn—who published his views in Drishat Zion—Hovevei Zion encountered significant opposition from the religious community, which for example insisted on the adoption of ancient and ineffective Biblical farming rules.

Food
In the Jewish communities of the Old Yishuv, bread was baked at home. People would buy flour in bulk or take their own wheat to be milled into the flour to bake bread in brick or mud ovens.

Small commercial bakeries were set up in the mid-19th century. Wheat flour was used to make  and biscuits, ordinary bread and cooking.

Milk was usually reserved for pregnant women or the sick. Almond milk was often used as a substitute.  or sour milk was sometimes purchased from Arab peasants. Sephardim kept soft cheese in tins of salt water to preserve it.

In the 1870s, meat was rare and eaten on Shabbat and festivals, but became more available towards the end of the 19th century; however, chicken remained a luxury item. Meat was primarily beef, but goat and lamb were eaten, particularly in the spring. Almost every part of the animal was used.

Fresh fish was a rare and expensive food in Jerusalem, particularly in the winter. Salted cod was soaked and then prepared for both weekdays and Sabbath meals. Sephardim also had a preference for fish called  and for sardines.

Even until the end of the 19th century, both Ashkenazim and Sephardim in Jerusalem stored large quantities of foodstuffs for the winter. In Sephardi households, these included rice, flour, lentils, beans, olives and cheese. Ashkenazim stored wine, spirits, olives, sesame oil and wheat.

At the end of the summer, large quantities of eggs were packed in slaked lime for the winter. Most Sephardic and Ashkenazi families would also buy large quantities of grapes to make wine. Olives were also pickled and Sephardim pickled eggplants, too.

See also
History of the Jews in the Land of Israel
History of Zionism
Palestinian Jews
Mea Shearim
Yemin Moshe
Mishkenot Sha'ananim
Edah HaChareidis
Yehoshua Leib Diskin
Yosef Chaim Sonnenfeld
Jacob Israël de Haan
Monsohn Family of Jerusalem

References

Bibliography
Parfitt, Tudor (1987) The Jews in Palestine, 1800–1882. Royal Historical Society studies in history (52). Woodbridge: Published for the Royal Historical Society by Boydell.
Blau, Moshe, Al Chomothecha Yerushalaim על חומותיך ירושלים, Hebrew, Bnei Brak (1968)
Rabbi Gedalya, Shaali Shelom Yerushalaim, Hebrew, Berlin (1726)- memoir of a participant in the Aliyah of Rabbi Yehuda Hasid
Rossoff, Dovid Where Heaven Touches Earth: Jewish Life in Jerusalem from Medieval Times to the Present, Guardian Press, Jerusalem, 6th Ed., (2004) 
Sofer, Yoseph Moshe, Moro DeAroh Yisroel מרא דארעא ישראל, Hebrew, Jerusalem (2003)
Szold, Henrietta, Recent Jewish Progress in Palestine in American Jewish Year Book (1915–16)
Yehoshua, Yakov, Ha’bayit ve Ha’rechov b’Yerushalayim Ha’yeshana (Home and Street in Old Jerusalem), Hebrew, Jerusalem, Rubin Mass (1961)
HaLevanon Vol. 11 no 42, Hebrew, Mainz, 1875
HaLevanon Vol. 11 no 43, Hebrew, Mainz, 1875

External links

Old Yishuv Court Museum.
Conflict in Zion, by: Michael Toben, Dr. Dov Goldflam
The Contribution of the Old Yishuv to the Revival of the Hebrew Language
Israeli Judaism
Herzog Hospital & the Rivlin family

 
History of Zionism